Andretti is both a surname and a given name. Notable people with the name include:

Surname
 Mario Andretti (born 1940), Italian-born American father of the prominent Andretti racing family:
 Michael Andretti (born 1962), son of Mario
 Marco Andretti (born 1987), son of Michael
 Jeff Andretti (born 1964), son of Mario
 Aldo Andretti (1940–2020), twin brother of Mario
 John Andretti (1963-2020), son of Aldo
 Jarett Andretti (born 1992), son of John
 Adam Andretti (born 1979), son of Aldo
Action Andretti, American professional wrestler

Given name
 Andretti Bain (born 1985), Bahamian sprinter

Fictional characters
 Mario Andretti (Cars), a fictional character from Disney Pixar's Cars

See also
 
 Andretti Autosport, an auto racing team, of which Michael Andretti is an owner
 Walkinshaw Andretti United, an Australian motor racing team, shareholders Andretti Autosport and United Autosports
 Andretti curse, a folk belief in a string of bad luck of the Andretti racing family
 Andretti Racing, a video game
 Michael Andretti's World GP, a 1990 video game also called Satoru Nakajima F-1 Hero
 Michael Andretti's Indy Car Challenge, a 1994 video game

Italian-language surnames
Patronymic surnames
Surnames from given names